West Concord is the name of some places in the United States:

 West Concord, Massachusetts
 West Concord station, a commuter rail station
 West Concord, Minnesota

See also
Concord West, New South Wales, Australia